Astra Force is an Indian animated superhero television series created by Amitabh Bachchan for Disney Channel. The series involves a superhero called Astra who is woken up from hibernation by two children, twins Neal and Tara, and they also become superheroes like him. Each episodes deals with action and adventure with these superheroes fighting aliens and other enemies.

Astra Force typically follows a format of two 11-minutes long independent "segments" per episode. The series is also available on Amazon Prime Video.

See also
List of Indian animated television series

References

2016 animated television series debuts
2016 Indian television series debuts
Indian children's animated action television series
Indian children's animated adventure television series
Indian children's animated science fiction television series
Indian children's animated superhero television series
Disney Channel (Indian TV channel) original programming
Indian children's animated fantasy television series